The Skavlen Transmitter is a television and radio guyed mast transmitter located in Mosvik, Norway at 63°46'19"N   10°57'4"E. The transmitter is 165 metres tall. Among the channels broadcast from the station include NRK1, NRK2, TV 2 (television), NRK P1, NRK P2, NRK P3, Radio Norge and P4 Radio Hele Norge (radio). The transmitter was constructed in 1973.

Buildings and structures in Trøndelag
Transmitter sites in Norway
Mosvik
1973 establishments in Norway
Norkring